The Day I Saw Your Heart is a 2011 family drama film directed by Jennifer Devoldère and starring Mélanie Laurent, Michel Blanc, Florence Loiret Caille, Guillaume Gouix, Kev Adams, Camille Chamoux and Malik Bentalha.

Plot
An unexpected pregnancy threatens to tear a family apart, but just might bring them closer together than ever before in this emotional family drama.

Cast 
 Mélanie Laurent as Justine Dhrey
 Michel Blanc as Eli Dhrey
 Florence Loiret Caille as Dom Dhrey
 Claude Perron as Suzanne Dhrey
 Guillaume Gouix as Sami
  as Bertrand
 Géraldine Nakache as Cécilia
 Manu Payet as Atom
  as Kirsten

References

External links 
 

2011 films
2010s French-language films
2011 comedy-drama films
Films scored by Nathan Johnson (musician)
French comedy-drama films
2010s French films